= Hindasgeri =

Coordinates: 15°10′N 75°01′E

- Village
- Interactive map of Hindasgeri
- Country: India
- State: Karnataka
- District: Dharwad

Government
  - Body: Village Panchayat

Population (2011)
  - Total: 1,462

Languages
  - Official: Kannada
- Time zone: UTC+5:30 (IST)
- ISO 3166 code: IN-KA
- Vehicle registration: KA
- Website: karnataka.gov.in

Hindasgeri is a village in Dharwad district of Karnataka, India.

== Demographics ==
As of the 2011 Census of India there were 270 households in Hindasgeri and a total population of 1,462 consisting of 747 males and 715 females. There were 200 children ages 0–6.
